The Speaker of the Australian Capital Territory Legislative Assembly is the presiding officer of the Australian Capital Territory Legislative Assembly, the unicameral legislature of the Australian Capital Territory.

Speakers of the Australian Capital Territory Legislative Assembly

Assistant Speakers of the Australian Capital Territory Legislative Assembly

See also

 Australian Capital Territory Legislative Assembly

References

External links
 Legislative Assembly of the ACT - Education - Fact sheets

Australian Capital Territory